Pontefract Hermitage is a medieval hermitage situated below the old Southgate entrance to the General Infirmary in Pontefract, West Yorkshire, England. It is a grade I listed structure.

The retreat consists of two chambers carved out of sandstone, side by side but on different levels. From the lower chamber a 63 step spiral staircase descends to a well. The Oratory contains an altar, a fireplace, a bench and low stool and a bed shelf. The entrance to the hermitage was protected by bolted doors.

Pontefract had hermits from the early 13th century, the earliest of whom, Peter of Pomfret, was executed by King John in 1213 for predicting his downfall. This was dramatised in the Shakespeare's play King John.  The hermit tradition continued for about three centuries. The hermitage described here dates from 1386 after Robert de Laythorpe granted the then hermit, Brother Adam, the hermitage and accompanying land for life. It was discovered in October 1854 by workmen laying a new sewer.

The hermitage can be visited on scheduled open days.

See also
Grade I listed buildings in West Yorkshire
Listed buildings in Pontefract

References

Grade I listed churches in West Yorkshire
Christian hermitages in the United Kingdom
Religious buildings and structures in West Yorkshire
Listed buildings in Pontefract